Albert Edward Hutchinson (30 September 1910 – May 1974) was an English professional footballer. Born in Sheffield, he is notable for being one of Torquay United's all-time leading appearance makers.

Career
Having scored an extraordinary 255 goals in three seasons for amateur Sheffield sides All Saints Old Boys and Atlas & Norfolk, Hutchinson was lured south to play for Third Division South side Luton Town in 1929. After impressing in the Luton Reserve side, he was elevated to the first team but only managed five senior appearances and one goal for the Hatters.

Hutchinson was then signed by Luton's Third Division South rivals Torquay United before the beginning of the 1930–31 season. Making his debut away to Newport County on 30 August 1930, he had to give up his favoured centre forward position to Jimmy Trotter. However, he immediately established himself as an inside forward and was an ever-present over the next two seasons. Hutchinson was eventually made United's captain and was the club's leading scorer for both the 1934–35 and 1935–36 seasons. He proved his versatility by playing at every position on the pitch during his Torquay career, even filling in for injured goalkeeper Percy Maggs during a home game against Brighton & Hove Albion where he managed to save a penalty.  By the end of the 1938–39 season, Hutchinson had made a record 338 appearances for Torquay before his career was interrupted by the outbreak of World War II.

He continued to play for Torquay United during the 1939–40 Wartime League before joining Buxton of the Cheshire League for two seasons after the war.

Hutchinson eventually returned to Sheffield to work in the steel industry before his death from lung cancer in May 1974.

Career statistics

References

1910 births
1974 deaths
Footballers from Sheffield
English footballers
Association football inside forwards
Forgemasters Sports & Social F.C. players
Luton Town F.C. players
Torquay United F.C. players
Buxton F.C. players
English Football League players
Deaths from lung cancer in England